Oncideres albopicta is a species of beetle in the family Cerambycidae. It was described by Martins and Galileo in 1990. It is known from Peru.

References

albopicta
Beetles described in 1990